Seale Chalk Pit is a  geological Site of Special Scientific Interest west of Guildford in Surrey. It is a Geological Conservation Review site and part of the Seale Chalk Pit and Meadow  private nature reserve, which is managed by the Surrey Wildlife Trust.

This former quarry exposes rocks of the Hog’s Back, and exhibits the separation of the folding Mesozoic rocks of the Weald from the Tertiary sediments of the London Basin.

There is no public access.

References

Surrey Wildlife Trust
Sites of Special Scientific Interest in Surrey
Geological Conservation Review sites